The Lakes is an unincorporated community and census-designated place (CDP) in Murray County, Minnesota, United States located just north of Currie, Minnesota. The population was 667 at the 2010 census. The community is centered about Lake Shetek, the largest lake in southwestern Minnesota. The lake and the community are located in parts of four townships in Murray County, which include Lake Sarah, Shetek, Murray, and Mason Townships.

Geography

U.S. Highway 59 and Minnesota State Highway 30 are both in the immediate area.

Demographics

As of the census of 2000, there were 619 people, 267 households, and 213 families residing in the CDP.  The population density was 17.3 people per square mile (6.7/km).  There were 598 housing units at an average density of 16.7/sq mi (6.4/km).  The racial makeup of the CDP was 99.35% White, 0.16% Native American, and 0.48% from two or more races. Hispanic or Latino of any race were 0.16% of the population.

There were 267 households, out of which 19.1% had children under the age of 18 living with them, 76.8% were married couples living together, 2.2% had a female householder with no husband present, and 20.2% were non-families. 16.1% of all households were made up of individuals, and 3.7% had someone living alone who was 65 years of age or older.  The average household size was 2.32 and the average family size was 2.59.

In the CDP, the population was spread out, with 16.6% under the age of 18, 3.9% from 18 to 24, 21.3% from 25 to 44, 42.6% from 45 to 64, and 15.5% who were 65 years of age or older.  The median age was 49 years. For every 100 females, there were 107.7 males.  For every 100 females age 18 and over, there were 107.2 males.

The median income for a household in the CDP was $43,250, and the median income for a family was $50,357. Males had a median income of $36,250 versus $22,083 for females. The per capita income for the CDP was $23,980.  None of the families and 0.8% of the population were living below the poverty line, including no under eighteens and none of those over 64.

Politics
The Lakes is located in Minnesota's 1st congressional district, most recently represented by Republican Jim Hagedorn of Blue Earth until his death in 2022. At the state level, The Lakes is located in Senate District 22, represented by Republican Doug Magnus, and in House District 22A, represented by Republican Joe Schomacker.

References

Census-designated places in Murray County, Minnesota
Census-designated places in Minnesota
Unincorporated communities in Murray County, Minnesota
Unincorporated communities in Minnesota